The 2006 Lehigh Mountain Hawks football team was an American football team that represented Lehigh University during the 2006 NCAA Division I FCS football season. Lehigh won the Patriot League co-championship but did not qualify for the national playoffs. 

In their first year under head coach Andy Coen, the Mountain Hawks compiled a 6–5 record. Julian Austin, John Reese and Sedale Threatt were the team captains.

The Mountain Hawks outscored opponents 299 to 222. Their 5–1 conference record tied for best in the Patriot League standings. Their season-ending loss to archrival Lafayette resulted in the shared title, and ended Lehigh's postseason hopes, as Lafayette was awarded the Patriot League's only berth in the FCS national playoffs.

Lehigh played its home games at Goodman Stadium on the university's Goodman Campus in Bethlehem, Pennsylvania.

Schedule

References

Lehigh
Lehigh Mountain Hawks football seasons
Patriot League football champion seasons
Lehigh Mountain Hawks football